The Tererro Formation is a geologic formation in Sangre de Cristo Mountains of New Mexico. It preserves fossils dating back to the early Mississippian.

Description

It is exposed throughout the Sangre de Cristo Mountains and in the San Luis, Las Vegas-Raton, Palo Duro, and Estancia Basins, as well in the western Tusas Mountains and the Nacimiento Mountains. It lies unconformably on the Espiritu Santo Formation and is unconformably overlain by the Log Springs Formation in the Nacimiento Mountains, the Flechado Formation in the northern Sangre de Cristo Mountains, and the La Pasada Formation in the southern Sangre de Cristo Mountains.

The formation is divided into the Macho Member, which is a massive ledge-forming limestone breccia (thickness ); the Turquillo Member, a thick-bedded mudstone; the Manuelitas Member, which is a light to medium gray calcarenite, limestone-pebble conglomerate, and finely crystallized locally cherty limestone (thickness ); and the Cowles Member, which is a light yellow gray to olive yellow cross-bedded silty calcarenite (thickness .

Fossils
The Manuelitas Member contains fossils of the foraminiferan Endothyra sp. of Meramecian (Visean) age.  The Macho, Turquillo, and Manuelitas Members contain microfossils characteristic of the Meramecian while the Cowles Member contains microfossils characteristic of the Chesterian (late Visean and Serpukhovian).

History of investigation
The formation was first defined by Baltz and Read in 1960. Armstrong and Mamet included it as the upper formation of their Arroyo Penasco Group in 1974 and added the Turquillo Member.

See also

 List of fossiliferous stratigraphic units in New Mexico
 Paleontology in New Mexico

References

Carboniferous formations of New Mexico
Carboniferous southern paleotropical deposits
Limestone formations of the United States